Zhoushan Archipelago, officially known as Zhoushan Archipelago New Area, is the newly established state-level new area (special economic and political administration zone) under the direct control of Zhoushan Municipal Government on 7 July 2011. Zhoushan Archipelago New Area was approved by the State Council of China's Central Government as the fourth state-level new area (following Pudong of Shanghai, Binhai of Tianjin, and Liangjiang of Chongqing), which is also the second state-level new development area in East China.

References

New areas (China)
Zhoushan